Jaslee Hatta is a former Singapore international football player who plays for Balestier Khalsa.

Club career
Previously, he played for SAFFC, Tampines Rovers, Young Lions, Woodlands Wellington and Gombak United.

International career
Selected for the National Team in 2004 and earned 3 caps to date.  Though called up by Radojko Avramović for the national squad, he has not played any games under him.

Honours

International
Singapore
ASEAN Football Championship: 2004

Club
Balestier Khalsa
 Singapore Cup: 2014
 League Cup: 2013

References

External links

1981 births
Living people
Singaporean footballers
Singapore international footballers
Gombak United FC players
Association football defenders
Warriors FC players
Tampines Rovers FC players
Woodlands Wellington FC players
Balestier Khalsa FC players
Singapore Premier League players
Young Lions FC players